The 2014–15 Mohun Bagan A.C. season is the 125th season of Mohun Bagan A.C. since the club's formation in 1889 and their 8th season in the I-League which is India's top football league. The team finished runners-up in the Calcutta Football League and were crowned Champions in the I-League. Mohun Bagan reached the semifinals of the King's Cup where they were defeated by Pune and they bowed out in the group stage of the Federation Cup.

Transfers

In

Pre-season

Mid-season

Out

Pre-season

Mid-season

Kits
Supplier: Shiv Naresh / Sponsors: McDowell's No.1

Squad

First-team squad

{| class="wikitable" style="text-align:center; font-size:90%; width:80%"
|-
!style="background:#7A1024; color:white; text-align:center;"|Name
!style="background:#1A5026; color:white; text-align:center;"|Nationality
!style="background:#7A1024; color:white; text-align:center;"|Position
!style="background:#1A5026; color:white; text-align:center;"|Date of Birth (Age)
|-
!colspan=5 style="background:#7a1024; color:white; text-align:center;"|Goalkeepers
|-
|Shilton Pal (captain)
|
|GK
|
|-
|Debjit Majumder 
|
|GK
|
|-
|Monotosh Ghosh 
|
|GK
|
|-
|Vinay Singh 
|
|GK
|
|-
|Laltu Mondal 
|
|GK
|—
|-
!colspan=5 style="background:#1A5026; color:white; text-align:center;"|Defenders
|-
|Bello Razaq
|
|DF
|
|-
|Anwar Ali
|
|DF
|
|-
|Pritam Kotal
|
|DF
|
|-
|Dhanachandra Singh
|
|DF
|
|-
|Kingshuk Debnath
|
|DF
|
|-
|Shouvik Ghosh
|
|DF
|
|-
|Sukhen Dey
|
|DF
|
|-
|Johny Routh
|
|DF
|—
|-
|Satish Singh
|
|DF
|
|-
|Pratik Chaudhari
|
|DF
|
|-
|Sonam Bhutia
|
|DF
|
|-
|Suman Hazra
|
|DF
|—
|-
!colspan=5 style="background:#7a1024; color:white; text-align:center;"|Midfielders
|-
|Manish Bhargav
|
|MF
|
|-
|Denson Devadas
|
|MF
|
|-
|Souvik Chakraborty
|
|MF
|
|-
|Sehnaj Singh
|
|MF
|
|-
|Tirthankar Sarkar
|
|MF
|
|-
|Lalkamal Bhowmick (vice-captain)
|
|MF
|
|-
|Bikramjit Singh
|
|MF
|
|-
|Pankaj Moula
|
|MF
|
|-
|Katsumi Yusa 
|
|MF
|
|-
|Sony Norde 
|
|MF
|
|-
|Ujjal Howladar
|
|MF
|
|-
|Adarsh Tamang
|
|MF
|
|-
|Ram Malik
|
|MF
|
|-
|Randeep Singh
|
|MF
|
|-
|Ayushman Chaturvedi
|
|MF
|—
|-
!colspan=5 style="background:#1A5026; color:white; text-align:center;"|Forwards
|-
|Chinadorai Sabeeth
|
|FW
|
|-
|Jeje Lalpekhlua 
|
|FW
|
|-
|Balwant Singh 
|
|FW
|
|-
|Pierre Boya MP
|
|FW
|
|-
|Prakash Roy 
|
|FW
|—
|-

Technical staff
{| class="wikitable"
|-
! Position
! Name
|-
| rowspan=2|Chief coach
| Subhash Bhowmick
|-
| Sanjoy Sen
|-
| Assistant coach
| Sankarlal Chakraborty
|-
| Goalkeeping coach
| Arpan Dey
|-
| Physical Trainer
| Djair Miranda Garcia
|-
| Physiotherapist
| Abhinandan Chatterjee
|-
| Club Doctor
| Dr. Protim Ray
|-
| Team Manager
| Satyajit Chatterjee

Statistics

Calcutta Football League stats

Last Updated: 15 September 2014Source: Statistics

Goal scorers
{| class="wikitable" style="text-align:center; font-size:95%"
|-
!Pos.
!Nat.
!Name
!Goal(s)
!Appearance(s)
|-
|FW||
|Balwant Singh
|7||9
|-
|FW||
|Pierre Boya
|6||9
|-
|FW||
|Chinadorai Sabeeth
|3||5
|-
|FW||
|Jeje Lalpekhlua
|2||4
|-
|MF||
|Pankaj Moula
|1||6
|-bgcolor=#efefef
!colspan=3 scope="col"|TOTAL
!scope="col"|
!scope="col"|

Disciplinary record
{| class="wikitable" style="text-align:center; font-size:95%"
!Pos.
!Nat.
!Player
!!!!!
!Notes
|-
|MF
|
|Sehnaj Singh
|3||0||0
|Missed Match: vs Bengal Nagpur Railway(9 September 2014)
|-
|MF
|
|Katsumi Yusa
|3||0||0
|Missed Match: vs Bengal Nagpur Railway(9 September 2014)
|-
|DF
|
|Shouvik Ghosh
|2||0||0
|Missed Match: vs East Bengal(31 August 2014)
|-
|FW
|
|Chinadorai Sabeeth
|1||0||0
|
|-
|MF
|
|Souvik Chakraborty
|1||0||0
|
|-
|DF
|
|Dhanachandra Singh
|1||0||0
|
|-
|DF
|
|Kingshuk Debnath
|1||0||0
|
|-
|DF
|
|Johny Routh
|1||0||0
|
|-
|DF
|
|Satish Singh
|1||0||0
|
|-
|DF
|
|Alao Fatai Adisa
|1||0||0
|
|-

King's Cup stats

Last Updated: 30 November 2014Source: Statistics

Goal scorers
{| class="wikitable" style="text-align:center; font-size:95%"
|-
!Pos.
!Nat.
!Name
!Goal(s)
!Appearance(s)
|-
|FW||
|Pierre Boya
|4||4
|-
|MF||
|Pankaj Moula
|2||3
|-
|MF||
|Sony Norde
|2||3
|-
|MF||
|Alex Silveira
|1||3
|-
|MF||
|Katsumi Yusa
|1||4
|-bgcolor=#efefef
!colspan=3 scope="col"|TOTAL
!scope="col"|
!scope="col"|

Disciplinary record
{| class="wikitable" style="text-align:center; font-size:95%"
!Pos.
!Nat.
!Player
!!!!!
!Notes
|-
|MF
|
|Tirthankar Sarkar
|0||0||1
|Missed Match: vs Nakhon Ratchasima(25 November 2014)
|-
|FW
|
|Pierre Boya
|2||0||0
|
|-
|MF
|
|Sehnaj Singh
|2||0||0
|
|-
|MF
|
|Lalkamal Bhowmick
|2||0||0
|
|-
|MF
|
|Katsumi Yusa
|1||0||0
|
|-
|MF
|
|Sony Norde
|1||0||0
|
|-
|DF
|
|Satish Singh
|1||0||0
|
|-
|DF
|
|Pratik Chaudhari
|1||0||0
|
|-
|DF
|
|Alex Silveira
|1||0||0
|
|-

Federation Cup stats

Last Updated: 6 January 2015Source: Statistics

Goal scorers
{| class="wikitable" style="text-align:center; font-size:95%"
|-
!Pos.
!Nat.
!Name
!Goal(s)
!Appearance(s)
|-
|FW||
|Pierre Boya
|2||3
|-
|DF||
|Kingshuk Debnath
|1||2
|-bgcolor=#efefef
!colspan=3 scope="col"|TOTAL
!scope="col"|
!scope="col"|

Disciplinary record
{| class="wikitable" style="text-align:center; font-size:95%"
!Pos.
!Nat.
!Player
!!!!!
!Notes
|-
|DF
|
|Shouvik Ghosh
|2||0||0
|Missed Match: vs Salgaocar(4 January 2015)
|-
|MF
|
|Lalkamal Bhowmick
|1||0||0
|
|-
|MF
|
|Bello Razaq
|1||0||0
|
|-

I-League stats

Last Updated: 31 May 2015Source: Statistics

Goal scorers
{| class="wikitable" style="text-align:center; font-size:95%"
|-
!Pos.
!Nat.
!Name
!Goal(s)
!Appearance(s)
|-
|MF||
|Sony Norde
|9
|19
|-
|MF||
|Katsumi Yusa
|7
|20
|-
|FW||
|Balwant
|6
|17
|-
|DF||
|Dhanachandra Singh
|2
|14
|-
|FW||
|Pierre Boya
|2
|16
|-
|DF||
|Pritam Kotal
|2
|17
|-
|FW||
|Jeje Lalpekhlua
|1
|12
|-
|MF||
|Denson Devadas
|1
|13
|-
|MF||
|Sehnaj Singh
|1
|18
|-
|MF||
|Bikramjit Singh
|1
|18
|-
|DF||
|Bello Razaq
|1
|20
|- bgcolor=#efefef
!colspan=3 scope="col"|TOTAL
!scope="col"|
!scope="col"|

Disciplinary record
{| class="wikitable" style="text-align:center; font-size:95%"
!Pos.
!Nat.
!Player
!!!!!
!Notes
|-
|FW
|
|Balwant Singh
|3||0||1
|Missed Match: vs Pune(25 April 2015)Missed Match: vs Mumbai(2 May 2015)
|-
|MF
|
|Sehnaj Singh
|3||0||1
|Missed Match: vs East Bengal(28 March 2015)Missed Match: vs Salgaocar(3 April 2014)
|-
|MF
|
|Sony Norde
|3||0||1
|Missed Match: vs Dempo(22 March 2015)
|-
|MF
|
|Bikramjit Singh
|1||1||0
|Missed Match: vs Shillong Lajong(8 April 2015)
|-
|MF
|
|Denson Devadas
|3||0||0
|
|-
|DF
|
|Kingshuk Debnath
|3||0||0
|
|-
|FW
|
|Pierre Boya
|1||0||0
|
|-
|MF
|
|Souvik Chakraborty
|1||0||0
|
|-
|MF
|
|Katsumi Yusa
|1||0||0
|
|-
|DF
|
|Anwar Ali
|1||0||0
|
|-
|DF
|
|Pritam Kotal
|1||0||0
|
|-
|DF
|
|Sukhen Dey
|1||0||0
|
|-
|GK
|
|Shilton Pal
|1||0||0
|
|-

Player statistics

Appearances and Goals

Last Updated: 31 May 2015  Apps: (Matches Started)+(Substitute Appearances)

Disciplinary record

Federation Cup

Group stage

I-League

Results summary

Matches

Calcutta Football League

King's Cup

Federation Cup

I-League

Notes

References

Mohun Bagan AC seasons
Mohun Bagan